Nemanja Zelenović (born 27 February 1990) is a Serbian handball player for VfL Gummersbach and the Serbia national team.

Club career
After coming through the youth categories of Crvena zvezda, Zelenović made his senior debut in the 2007–08 season, as the club won the championship title. He moved abroad and signed with Slovenian side Celje in 2011.

International career
At international level, Zelenović represented Serbia in two World Championships (2013 and 2019) and four European Championships (2014, 2016, 2018 and 2020).

Honours
Crvena zvezda
 Serbian Handball Super League: 2007–08
Celje
 Slovenian First League: 2013–14
 Slovenian Cup: 2011–12, 2012–13, 2013–14
SC Magdeburg
 DHB-Pokal: 2015–16

References

External links
 

1990 births
Living people
Sportspeople from Knin
Serbs of Croatia
Serbian male handball players
RK Crvena zvezda players
Frisch Auf Göppingen players
Handball-Bundesliga players
Expatriate handball players
Serbian expatriate sportspeople in Slovenia
Serbian expatriate sportspeople in Poland
Serbian expatriate sportspeople in Germany